This was the first edition of the tournament since it was discontinued in 2011.

Holger Rune won the title after defeating Francesco Passaro 6–1, 2–6, 6–4 in the final.

Seeds

Draw

Finals

Top half

Bottom half

References

External links
Main draw
Qualifying draw

Sanremo Challenger - 1